The Nolan School of Hotel Administration (SHA, more commonly known as the Hotel School) at Cornell University is a specialized business school in the SC Johnson College of Business at Cornell University, a private Ivy League university located in Ithaca, New York. Founded in 1922, it was the world's first four-year intercollegiate school devoted to hospitality management.

The undergraduate business curriculum at SHA is one of only three such Ivy League programs accredited by the Association to Advance Collegiate Schools of Business (AACSB). Students in the Hotel School are referred to as Hotelies. Participants come from all over the world to take classes at such locations as Ithaca, New York; Brussels, Belgium; Singapore; and site visits in Las Vegas and New York City.

History

The nature of SHA was in large part the creation of professor Howard B. Meek. He was supported in his efforts by New York City hotel men, a number of whom testified in Albany, urging the legislature to appropriate $11,000 per year for the school. Edward M. Tierney of the Ansonia Hotel stated "There is a dearth of competent hotel , and such a course at Cornell would have the endorsement and co-operation of the hotel men generally throughout the country... The war brought a great change in the hotel worker, and the old-time attitude of servility has been replaced by efficient service giving and courtesy. Young men now enter the hotel business just as they would banking, railroad, or commercial life, to find a future in it, and the hotel man must offer the same attractions of commensurate pay and advancement."

In 1927, at the 2nd Annual Hotel Ezra Cornell, Meek convinced a skeptical Ellsworth Milton Statler of the value of the concept; Statler declared "I'm converted. Meek can have any damn thing he wants." Statler and his wife became major benefactors of the school, eventually donating a total of more than $10 million.  In 1950, the school was transformed from being a part of, Cornell's School of Home Economics (now the School of Human Ecology), a statutory college, into becoming a separate, endowed unit of Cornell.

In 1948, the Statler Foundation funded the construction of a 50-room Statler Inn and the adjoining class-room building called Statler Hall. The building also housed Cornell's faculty club. The 750-seat Alice Statler Auditorium was added to the southern end in 1956. In 1986, the original Statler Inn was torn down and replaced with the current 150-room Statler Hotel & J. Willard Marriott Executive Education Center. The Statler Hotel underwent another renovation in 2006 and now has 153 guest rooms. The Statler Hotel is the only hotel on campus.

On January 28, 2016, the Cornell Board of Trustees authorized the design and implementation of a plan for a Cornell College of Business, comprising the university's three exceptional accredited business schools: the Nolan School of Hotel Administration (SHA), the Charles H. Dyson School of Applied Economics and Management (Dyson), and the Samuel Curtis Johnson Graduate School of Management (Johnson). The new Cornell College of Business began enrollment in the fall of 2016.

Profile

The school enrolled 895 undergraduates and 67 graduate students in 2011, hailing from almost 50 countries; it is Cornell's second smallest undergraduate college. Its curriculum encompasses all facets of general business management with a focus on the hospitality industry. Although not required, many students choose to work at the Statler Hotel to supplement their education at the school. SHA employs 65 full-time faculty members, most with field management experience.

In 1954, Conrad Hilton, who was closely associated with the school after his company bought the Statler hotel chain, called it "the greatest hotel school in the world."  Conrad Hilton later became more closely associated with another school after he founded the Hilton College of Hotel and Restaurant Management at the University of Houston in 1969.

SHA's course catalog includes several offerings for students in other Cornell colleges, notably HADM 4300, Introduction to Wines, a wine tasting course which enrolls 600–900 students each semester, as well as a 2-credit cooking course.

SHA also runs technical courses such as Real Estate Finance and Investments (HADM 4428), Securitization and Structured Finance (HADM 4425), and Investment Portfolio Analysis (HADM 4429). Roughly 40% of undergraduates go into banking or consulting fields after graduation.

In a 2007 Newsweek article dubbing Cornell the "Hottest Ivy", SHA was mentioned to be "considered the world's best." The School was ranked the No. 1 hospitality and hotel management school in the world for 2015 by CEOWORLD magazine.

Fictional Hotelies have included:

 In Absurdistan by Gary Shteyngart, a hotel manager attended the Cornell University Nolan School of Hotel Administration
 In Dirty Dancing, Neil graduated from Cornell's School of Hotel Management
 In Hotel by Arthur Hailey, Peter McDermott, manager of the St. Gregory.
 In 30 Rock, Tracy Jordan's friend, Fat Balls 
 In Veep, Gary Walsh says he graduated with a degree in Hotel Management from Cornell University.

Some notable alumni of the school include the founders of Alamo Rent-A-Car; Arby's; Burger King; Dunkin' Donuts; Duty Free Shoppers Group ; Shake Shack ; HVS Global Hospitality Services; Lyft and PriceWaterhouseCoopers Global Hospitality Consulting. (For more, List of Cornell University alumni)

Statler Hotel

The full-service Statler Hotel has 153 guest rooms at the center of Cornell's campus. The hotel also serves as a primary teaching tool for the Nolan School of Hotel Administration. Each year more than 200 SHA students work alongside professionals in a range of hotel and restaurant operations.

In 2011, 2012, and 2013, the Statler Hotel was awarded a 4-diamond rating by AAA.  In January, 2020, hotel executive Arthur Keith was named its new General Manager.

The Leland C. and Mary M. Pillsbury Institute for Hospitality Entrepreneurship
The Leland C. and Mary M. Pillsbury Institute for Hospitality Entrepreneurship

Center for Hospitality Research
The Cornell Center for Hospitality Research (CHR) is a service of the Cornell University Nolan School of Hotel Administration  for the hospitality industry. With the support of industry partners  the center promotes, supports, and distributes hospitality research. Three series of center publications are posted at no charge on its site chr.cornell.edu. They are Cornell Hospitality Reports, Cornell Hospitality Tools, and Industry Perspectives. In addition, the center is the publisher of the Cornell Hospitality Quarterly, now entering its sixth decade of publication, which is available by subscription only. The center's research agenda promotes studies that have direct implications for improving hospitality operations, but must be based on solid theoretical and procedural principles. The free reports and tools are more practitioner oriented, while the award-winning Quarterly includes more of the theory and educational content appropriate for students and academics. The center also produces a series of industry roundtables and participates in high level industry conferences  to share research findings.

Publications 
Cornell Hospitality Reports  shares the knowledge created by center fellows and other researchers.

Cornell Hospitality Tools  - web-based interactive tools for the hospitality industry.

Cornell Hospitality Quarterly  - a leading academic journal for the hospitality industry.

Industry Perspective:  A White Paper Series from Cornell  - provide insight from hospitality industry leaders on the issues that matter most to senior executives and hospitality practitioners.

Hospitality Roundtable Proceedings  - offer a thorough report on roundtable's deliberations.

Best Practices  - identified and recognized Best Practive Champions across all segments of the U.S. lodging industry.

Notes

References

Huxtable, Ada Louise (1973), "Hospitality and the Plastic Esthetic", The New York Times, October 14, 1973, p. 153
New York Times, January 22, 1922, p. 33: "Hotel Men Approve Cornell Training: Hope Legislature Will Appropriate $11,000 a Year for Educating Help."
History of the Hotel School "Meek can have any damn thing he wants."
 Brad Edmonson, Hospitality Leadership: The Cornell Hotel School. (1996)

External links
 
Cornell Center for Hospitality Research

Hotel Administration
Hotel Administration
Hotels in New York (state)
Hospitality schools in the United States
1922 establishments in New York (state)
Educational institutions established in 1922